Schoeman Botha (born 2 June 1964) is a South African former cricketer. He played in two first-class and two List A matches for Boland in 1988/89.

See also
 List of Boland representative cricketers

References

External links
 

1964 births
Living people
South African cricketers
Boland cricketers
People from Uitenhage
Cricketers from the Eastern Cape